

Buildings and structures

Buildings

 709 – Jami Al-Aqsa first built in Jerusalem, Umayyad Empire (begun in 707).
 709 – Small Wild Goose Pagoda in China is completed.
 before 710 – Qasr Kharana castle built in the Umayyad Empire.
 710 – The capital of Japan is moved from Fujiwara-kyō to Heijō-kyō (平城京) (Nara).
 711 – Fujiwara-kyō is destroyed by a fire.
 c. 711 – Hōryū-ji temple reconstructed in Ikaruga, Japan.
 714 – Umayyad Mosque built in Damascus, capital of the Umayyad Empire. Begun in 707.
 715 – Umayyad city of Anjar built in Lebanon.
 c. 715 – Qasr Amra castle built in the Umayyad Empire.
 c. 717–757 – Church of St John the Baptist, Kerch in Crimea is constructed.
 721 – Al-Omari Mosque (Bosra) completed in Umayyad Syria.
 c. 730–800 – Gebang Hindu temple at Yogyakarta on Java is built.
 739 – A Benedictine monastery is built adjoining the Basilica of Sant'Ambrogio in Milan.
 c. 744 – Construction begun on the Mshatta Umayyad Palace.
 c. 744 – Umayyad palace of Khirbat al-Mafjar near Jericho, Palestine built.
 746 – Castle of Gormaz built in Spain.
 750s – Belfry of Old St. Peter's Basilica in Rome constructed.
 751
 Bulguksa of Korea is expanded.
 Seokguram of Korea is constructed.
 Tōdai-ji (東大寺) temple in Heijō-kyō (Nara), Japan is completed (the modern-day building is a 1709 reconstruction).
 755 – Hieroglyphic staircase finished in the Maya city of Copán.
 759 – Tōshōdai-ji (唐招提寺) temple founded in Heijō-kyō (Nara), Japan.
 762 – Medinat as-Salam (modern-day Baghdad) founded as the capital of the Abbasid Caliphate.
 765 – Saidai-ji (西大寺) temple is founded in Heijō-kyō (Nara), Japan.
 768 – Kasuga Shrine (春日大社) first founded in Heijō-kyō (Nara), Japan.
 770 – Rock-carved Kailash Temple in Ellora, India commissioned by Rashtrakuta King Krishna I.
 771 – Jami Al-Aqsa in Jerusalem rebuilt by the Abbasid caliph Al Mansur.
 774
 Lorsch Abbey consecrated.
 Construction of Charlemagne's palace at Ingelheim am Rhein begun.

 775 – Basilica of St Denis near Paris is consecrated.
 c. 775–778 – Al-Ukhaidir Fortress built in Mesopotamia, Abbasid Caliphate.
 By 778 – Kalasan temple on Java completed. The adjacent Sari temple is built about the same time.
 781 – San Vicente of Oviedo church, first monument built in Oviedo, Kingdom of Asturias.
 784–6 – Aljama Mosque (Mosque of Córdoba (Mezquita de Córdoba)) built in the Emirate of Córdoba, designed by Sidi ben Ayub for Emir Abd al-Rahman I.
 786 – Aachen Cathedral begun.
 787 – Construction of the first Würzburg Cathedral (building no longer existing).
 790s – Villa and oratory at Germigny-des-Prés begun.
 799 – Lyon Cathedral begun.
 second half of the 8th century; Church of St Donatus, located in Zadar, Croatia.

Births
 742 – Odo of Metz, Carolingian architect (died 814)

Deaths

See also
7th century in architecture
9th century in architecture
Timeline of architecture

References

Architecture